Oldradus de Ponte (died 1335) was an Italian jurist born in Lodi, active in the Roman curia in the early fourteenth century. Previously he had taught at the University of Padua. According to Joseph Canning he was an authority in both canon law and civil law, and his consilia (legal opinions) are the earliest surviving ones.

Works

References
Norman Zacour (1990), Jews and Saracens in the Consilia of Oldradus de Ponte

Notes

External links

14th-century Italian jurists
Canon law jurists
1335 deaths
Year of birth unknown
14th-century Latin writers